The Schwarzhorn is a mountain on the border of Switzerland and Liechtenstein in the Rätikon range of the Eastern Alps.

Sometimes the mountain is listed as Hinter-Grauspitz, but according to reference book "Die Orts- und Flurnamen des Fürstentums Liechtenstein", these are two different mountain peaks.

References

Maps

External links 
 The Tallest Mountains In Liechtenstein
 Schwarzhorn on Peakbagger
Mountains of Liechtenstein
Mountains of Switzerland
Liechtenstein–Switzerland border
International mountains of Europe
Mountains of Graubünden
Mountains of the Alps
Two-thousanders of Switzerland